Friedrich Wilhelm Felix von Bärensprung, sometimes Baerensprung (30 March 1822 – 26 August 1864) was a German dermatologist born in Berlin. His father, Friedrich von Bärensprung (1779-1841), was mayor of Berlin in 1832-34.

In 1843 he obtained his doctorate at Halle an der Saale, then furthered his studies in pathology at Prague, where he was also involved with entomological research. In 1845 he became a clinical assistant to Peter Krukenberg (1788-1865) at Halle, and several years later, founded a private clinic in Halle (1850). In 1853 he was appointed chief physician at the Syphilisklinik at the Berlin Charité, and in 1857 became an associate professor at the University of Berlin.

Bärensprung is credited as being the first physician to demonstrate a definite link between herpes zoster and a lesion of the dorsal root ganglion. Subsequently, he identified nine varieties of the disorder, of which he classified according to the nerve involved. In 1854, he provided the first description of tinea cruris, a condition that is sometimes referred to as "Bärensprung's disease" in medical literature.

He was in favor of housing projects for the impoverished, and also advocated the creation of day nurseries and children's homes. These measures, he reasoned, were an effective means to stop the spread of epidemics such as tuberculosis and scrofulosis. Among his written works was Atlas der Hautkrankheiten, an atlas on skin diseases that was edited and published posthumously by Ferdinand von Hebra (1867).

In the field of entomology, he was instrumental in the founding of the journal, Berliner Entomologische Zeitschrift, in which he published papers on Hemiptera.

Selected publications 
 Medical
 Beiträge zur Anatomie und Pathologie der menschlichen Haut (1848) - Contributions to the anatomy and pathology of human skin.
 Der Typhus in Obeschlesien im Jahre 1848 - Typhus in Upper Silesia in the year 1848.
 Epidemie von exanthemischen Typhus (1849) - Epidemic of mixed-exanthem typhus.
 Untersuchungen über die Temperaturvehältnisse des Foetus und des erwachsenen Menschen im gesunden und kranken Zustande (1851–52)
 Ueber die Folge und den Verlauf epidemischer Krankheiten. Beobachtungen aus der medizinischen Geschichte und Statistik der Stadt Halle (1854) - On the pathology of epidemic diseases.
 Die Gürtelkrankheit (1861) - On shingles.
 Über hereditäre Syphilis (1864) - On hereditary syphilis.
 Entomology
 Synonymische Bemerkungen. Ueber Hemiptera.Berliner Entomologische Zeitschrift Volume 2:79-81 (1858),
 Neue und seltene Rhynchoten der europäischen Fauna. Berliner Entomologische Zeitschrift 2:188-208, pl. II.(1858)
 Neue und seltene Rhynchoten der europäischen Fauna. Zweites Stück. Berliner Entomologischer Zeitschrift 3:329-338 (1859)
 Hemiptera Heteroptera Europae systematice disposita. Berliner Entomologische Zeitschrift 4:1-25 (1860).

References 
 Friedrich Wilhelm Felix von Bärensprung @ Who Named It
 Deckert, J. 2001. Lebensdaten und Heteroptera-Sammlung des Felix Von Baerensprung (1822-1864). Beitrage zur Entomologie 51:(2):401-409

1822 births
1864 deaths
Scientists from Berlin
People from the Province of Brandenburg
German dermatologists
German entomologists
Academic staff of the Humboldt University of Berlin
Martin Luther University of Halle-Wittenberg alumni